Oquaga Creek is a river in Broome County and Chenango County in New York. It flows into the West Branch Delaware River by Deposit, New York.

References

Rivers of New York (state)
Rivers of Broome County, New York
Tributaries of the West Branch Delaware River